The COVID-19 pandemic in Haiti is part of the worldwide pandemic of coronavirus disease 2019 caused by severe acute respiratory syndrome coronavirus 2. The virus was confirmed to have reached Haiti in March 2020. The index case was in Port-au-Prince. As of 14 September 2021, there are 21,178 total confirmed cases, 1,184 active cases, about 32,000 suspected cases, with 591 deaths and 8,657 recoveries. Haiti has administered 50,624 doses of the COVID-19 vaccination.

Background 
On 12 January 2020, the World Health Organization (WHO) confirmed that a novel coronavirus was the cause of a respiratory illness in a cluster of people in Wuhan City, Hubei Province, China, which was reported to the WHO on 31 December 2019.

The case fatality ratio for COVID-19 has been much lower than SARS of 2003, but the transmission has been significantly greater, with a significant total death toll.

Timeline

2020

March 
On 16 March, at midnight local time, Haiti's Prime Minister, Joseph Jouthe, announced a two-week suspension of flights from Europe, Canada, the Dominican Republic, and Latin America.

On 19 March, the first two COVID-19 cases in the country were confirmed.

April 
On 5 April, the country confirmed its first death from COVID-19.

On 9 April, the World Bank's Board of Executive Directors approved a US$20 million grant for the Haiti COVID-19 Response Project.

On 12 April, The Intercept wrote that "the Haitian government has closed schools and most factories and is encouraging people to adopt social distancing measures."

On 15 April 2020 the Prime Minister of Haiti Joseph Jouthe announced that Haiti would reopen textile factories the following Monday 20 April.
Textiles account for 90 percent of Haiti's exports, and the industry would resume at 30 percent capacity to ensure workplace social distancing.

The Miami Herald wrote that Jouthe's messaging "seems counter to what the regional health experts are telling countries in the region," noting that Pan American Health Organization Director Carissa Etienne had warned that social distancing "remains our best bet to reduce transmission and slow the spread of the virus" and stated that "COVID-19 has yet to hit with full force in our region, particularly in Latin America and the Caribbean, and we expect it to intensify in the next few weeks," and that "the rise in hospitalizations and deaths we see in some countries highlights how quickly the situation could change."

May 
On 5 May, Dr. Etienne, Director of the Pan American Health Organization, expressed her worries about Haiti. There are already 17,000 repatriates and that number is expected to rise to 55,000. Etienne called the situation "a perfect storm approaching."

On 8 May, the United Nations' Economic and Social Council's Ad-Hoc Advisory Group on Haiti expressed concern that "Unless adequately managed, the COVID-19 health emergency and its socio-economic impact could become a humanitarian catastrophe, threatening to unravel some of the hard-won development and security gains achieved in the past decade and a half in Haiti".

About a third of Haitians practice Vodou, and in view of the shortage of medical facilities, by late May, the Vodou community had identified 1,000 Vodou temples with space available that could be used to isolate up to 15 COVID-19 patients each.
Reuters quoted Vodou priestess (mambo) Lamercie Charles as stating that "We live in a country where the health system is not able to respond to the challenge of the pandemic, so we rely on natural remedies instead... I consider my temple a clinic".

June 
On 4 June, Doctors Without Borders/Medecins Sans Frontieres (MSF) expressed alarm that the number of COVID-19 cases in Haiti had increased rapidly in less than one month from 100 cases to more than 2,600 cases and 50 deaths.

2021

July 
On July 7, 2021, Haiti's former president, Jovenel Moise was assassinated, leaving Haiti with an unstable political system during the COVID-19 pandemic. The first doses of the COVID-19 vaccine were delivered on July 13, 2021, to Haiti. 500,000 vaccine doses were made available to the Haitians.

August 
On 14 August 2021, Haiti experienced a 7.2 magnitude earthquake. The natural disaster has disrupted the COVID-19 response and vaccine distribution.

September 
As of 17 September 2021, 0.16% of Haitians had been fully vaccinated against COVID-19 and 0.21% had received at least one dose. Non-governmental organizations assisting with the response to the earthquake were also providing vaccinations.

Statistics

Daily New Confirmed Cases

Daily New Deaths

Analysis & commentary
Richard Frechette, a 67-year-old physician and Roman Catholic priest from the United States who is working in Haiti, stated in an article published on 9 April 2020 that

See also

 COVID-19 pandemic in North America
 COVID-19 pandemic by country
 Influx of disease in the Caribbean
 HIV/AIDS in Latin America
 2013–2014 chikungunya outbreak
 2009 swine flu pandemic
 2019–2020 dengue fever epidemic
 COVID-19 vaccination in Haiti

Notes

References

External links 
  Daily reports on Coronavirus pandemic  on mspp.gouv.ht
  MSPP Plan of Preparation and Response against Coronavirus (March 2020) on mspp.gouv.ht

 
COVID-19 pandemic
COVID-19 pandemic
Haiti
Haiti
Disease outbreaks in Haiti